Finn 5 fel! is an album from Swedish pop group Gyllene Tider, released on 9 June 2004. The album stayed at #1 in Sweden for six weeks.  It was the first full studio album recorded by the group since 1984's The Heartland Café.

The album was a critical and commercial success. It received favourable reviews and was the best selling album in Sweden during 2004 after selling 230,000 copies.

Track listing

 "En sten vid en sjö i en skog" (No. 1 in Swedish singles chart)
 "Solsken" (No. 20 in Swedish singles chart)
 "Tuffa tider (för en drömmare)"  (No. 1 in Swedish singles chart)
 "Ordinärt mirakel"
 "Ta mej... nu är jag din!"
 "Jag borde förstås vetat bättre" (No. 23 in Swedish singles chart)
 "Du måste skämta"
 "Nere på gatan"
 "72"
 "Ande i en flaska"
 "Varje gång det regnar"
 "Hjärta utan hem"
 "Speciell"
 "Har du nånsin sett en dröm gå förbi?"

Critical reception

Charts

Weekly charts

Year-end charts

Certifications

References

2004 albums
Gyllene Tider albums